Elections were held in the Australian state of Victoria on Saturday 9 June 1934 to elect 17 of the 34 members of the state's Legislative Council for six year terms. MLC were elected using preferential voting.

Results

Legislative Council

|}

Retiring Members

United Australia
Frederick Brawn MLC (Wellington)
Horace Richardson MLC (South Western)

Candidates
Sitting members are shown in bold text. Successful candidates are highlighted in the relevant colour. Where there is possible confusion, an asterisk (*) is also used.

See also
1935 Victorian state election

References

1934 elections in Australia
Elections in Victoria (Australia)
1930s in Victoria (Australia)
June 1934 events